is a Japanese singer from Osaka Prefecture who is signed to MAGES. and KADOKAWA. After winning the Animax All-Japan Anisong Grand Prix in 2011, she made her debut in 2012 with the release of her first single "Choir Jail", which peaked at 34 on the Oricon charts; the title track of which was used as the opening theme to the anime television series Dusk Maiden of Amnesia. She released her first album 17, in 2014, two albums in 2015, and a further album Lead, in 2016.

Suzuki cites the character Sheryl Nome from Macross Frontier as her inspiration for making music for anime. Her music has been featured in anime series such as The Pet Girl of Sakurasou, No Matter How I Look at It, It's You Guys' Fault I'm Not Popular!, No Game No Life, and Re:Zero − Starting Life in Another World. She has also performed in events in Japan such as Animelo Summer Live and Animax Musix, and at international events in China, Germany, the United States, and Southeast Asia. In 2018, Suzuki made her voice acting debut, playing the role of Rin in the anime television series Lost Song.

Career
Suzuki was born in Osaka, Japan as the youngest of three children. She began aspiring to become a singer at a young age, taking dance lessons with the encouragement of her mother, and participating in singing competitions by the age of six. After being inspired in high school by the character Sheryl Nome from the anime series Macross Frontier, she decided that she wanted to become an anison singer. She applied for the Animax All-Japan Anisong Grand Prix in 2010 but failed to qualify.

Suzuki started her musical career after winning the Animax All-Japan Anisong Grand Prix in 2011. Her first single "Choir Jail" was released on April 25, 2012, as the opening theme for the 2012 anime television series Dusk Maiden of Amnesia. She also made a voice acting cameo during the series' fifth episode. "Choir Jail" peaked at number 34 on the Oricon weekly charts and charted for nine weeks.

Suzuki's singles have corresponded with anime themes for much of her career. Her second single, "Days of Dash", was released in November 2012 as The Pet Girl of Sakurasou's ending theme. She made her first live concert appearance at Animelo Summer Live in August 2012, followed by Animax Musix in November 2012. Her third single  was released in February 2013 as the second opening theme to The Pet Girl of Sakurasou. Her fourth single was a double-release titled , a collaboration in August 2013 with the band Kiba of Akiba. and the songs were used in the 2013 anime television series No Matter How I Look at It, It's You Guys' Fault I'm Not Popular!, and in an animated promotional video for the trading card game Ange Vierge. Her fifth single  was released in November 2013, as the opening and ending themes to the anime television series Freezing Vibration.

Suzuki released her first album 17 in February 2014. Her sixth single "This Game" was released in May 2014, and was used as the opening theme to No Game No Life. Her seventh single  was released in November 2014, and was used as the opening theme to Lord Marksman and Vanadis. Her eighth single "Absolute Soul" was released in February 2015 as the opening theme to Absolute Duo. She released her second album 18: Colorful Gift in March 2015, and a mini-album titled 18: More in October 2015. She transferred to the talent agency Amuleto in January 2016. Her ninth single "Beat Your Heart" was released in January 2016 as the opening theme to BBK/BRNK. Her tenth single "Redo" was released in May 2016, and was used as the first opening theme to Re:Zero − Starting Life in Another World. Her eleventh single "Love is My Rail" was released in August 2016 as the opening theme to anime adaptation of Ange Vierge.

Her twelfth single "Chaos Syndrome" was released in February 2017 as the ending theme to Chaos;Child. Suzuki made an appearance at Anime Festival Asia in Singapore in November 2016. During a birthday live held at Makuhari Messe on November 5, 2016, it was announced that she would make her voice acting debut as the heroine of the anime series Lost Song, a new anime project produced by Mages.

Suzuki released her third album Lead in March 2017, and her thirteenth single "Blow Out" was released in May 2017; the title track was used as the opening theme to the 2017 anime television series Akashic Records of Bastard Magic Instructor. She made an appearance at Anime Expo in Los Angeles in July 2017, and at Germany's AnimagiC anime convention in August 2017. Her song "There is a Reason" was used as the theme song for anime film No Game No Life Zero; the song was included on the album No Song No Life in July 2017. She appeared at Anime Festival Asia Indonesia in August 2017, Cosplay Mania in the Philippines in October 2017, and Anime Festival Asia Singapore in November 2017. She released the compilation album Life of Dash in December 2017. Her fourteenth single , released in May 2018, was used as the opening theme for Lost Song.

In 2018, Suzuki returned to AnimagiC and also performed at Asia Comic Con in Bangkok and Penang Anime Matsuri in Malaysia. Her fifteenth single  was released in October 2018; the title song was used for the anime series Between the Sky and Sea and features Suzuki playing guitar. She performed at New York's Anime NYC event in November 2018, and at Ressaca Friends in São Paulo, Brazil, in December 2018.

In January 2019, her song "Anubis" was used in the video game Robotics;Notes DaSH. Her sixteenth single  was released in May 2019; the title track is used as the ending theme to the anime series YU-NO: A Girl Who Chants Love at the Bound of this World. She made an appearance at SMASH! in Sydney, Australia in July 2019. She went on an Asian tour in the second half of 2019, with performances in Shanghai, Hong Kong, and Taiwan. She released her fourth album Shake Up! in November 2019.

In January 2020, Suzuki's management announced that she had transferred to the talent agency Double Digital, a newly formed subsidiary of internet company CyberAgent. She released her seventeenth single "Theater of Life" in July 2020, which was used as the opening theme to the anime series Deca-Dence. She released her eighteenth single "Realize" in August 2020, which was used as the opening theme to the second season of Re:Zero − Starting Life in Another World. Her nineteenth single  was released in September 2020, which was used as the ending theme of the anime series Mr Love: Queen's Choice. In October 2020, Suzuki announced she would go on a hiatus in December 2020 for vocal cord surgery. After returning from her hiatus, she released her twentieth single "Bursty Greedy Spider" in May 2021, which was used as the second opening theme to the anime series So I'm a Spider, So What?. Her twenty-first single "Missing Promise" was released on August 25, 2021, which was used as the ending theme of the anime series Higurashi When They Cry: Sotsu. Her twenty-second single "Inochi no Tomoshibi" was released on November 5, 2021; the title song was used as the opening theme of the anime series Deep Insanity: The Lost Child.

Suzuki released her album Ultra Flash on May 25, 2022; it includes the song "Proud Stars" which was used as the ending theme to the anime series Shin Ikki Tousen. She and Kashitarō Itō also performed the song "Melodic Road Movie" which was used as the theme song to the anime film Isekai Quartet Movie: Another World. Later that year, she announced that she would be leaving Digital Double and forming her own personal management office. She released the single "Love? Reason why!!" on October 26, 2022; the title track is used as the opening theme to the anime series Love Flops, while the coupling song "Secret Code" was later used as the ending theme to the anime series Spy Classroom.

Musical style and influences
In an interview with Anime News Network, Suzuki listed One Direction and Avril Lavigne as among her favorite Western artists, and considers the character Sheryl Nome (voiced by May'n) from Macross Frontier as her inspiration for entering the anison industry. She described how, although she was already determined to become a singer, the voice of Sheryl, which Suzuki describes as "really special, crystal clear, yet powerful enough", gave her chills and influenced her to perform music for anime. She described how excited she was performing in front of crowds shortly after her debut. She describes the song "Love Is My Rail" as the song which encouraged her to continue pursuing her dream of being a singer.

In an interview with Real Sound, Suzuki related her experiences working on her single "Redo". She describes the title song as difficult but fun and exciting to sing live. Having watched Re:Zero, she thought about the series' world view and the character Subaru, and sang the song to fit that worldview. She wanted to put "50% of the anime's worldview" and "50% her own feelings" into the song. She describes the single's coupling song "Moebius" as stemming from a policy where she was not to lie to anyone, and how she reflected on that four years after her debut. She mentioned how the song represents that she wants to establish a relationship of trust with her fans. In an interview with Eplus, she mentions that the name of her 20th birthday live, "Cheers", is meant to convey a message of "thank you" to the people who had supported her career up to that point.

In an interview with Diga Online, Suzuki described the production of her album Lead and single "Blow Out". She described how difficult life was as a high school student while she was focusing on her music career. Following her graduation from high school and entering university, she felt that she had made many sacrifices for her career. The title of the album came from the idea that she had become a new person after her concert during her 20th birthday, as she wanted to "lead everyone" through her songs. The song "My Shining Ray" was written to represent a big star that would lead people; she also described her experience singing the song as feeling like she was spreading wings. While singing the song "Redo" for Re:Zero, she considered it fun to sing as it "was completely different from herself". She describes "Blow Out" as a song about blowing away negative feelings.

In her Anime NYC 2018 interview with Arama! Japan, Suzuki stated that as she grows older, "I'm able to express my feelings more freely and show my true self without holding back. I've always had fun performing live, but the ability to fully be myself on stage has allowed me to enjoy my live shows even more."

Voice roles

Anime
Lost Song as Rin

Discography

Albums

Studio Albums 
 (February 26, 2014)

 (March 4, 2015)

 (March 8, 2017)

 (November 6, 2019)

 (May 25, 2022)

Compilation Albums 
 (December 20, 2017)

Singles

Digital singles

Collaboration singles

As guest singer

Notes

References

External links
 Official blog 
  
 Official agency profile 
 

Living people
Japanese women pop singers
Musicians from Osaka Prefecture
Anime singers
21st-century Japanese singers
21st-century Japanese women singers
Year of birth missing (living people)